Tupelo National Battlefield commemorates the Battle of Tupelo, also known as the Battle of Harrisburg, fought from July 14 to 15, 1864, near Tupelo, Mississippi during the American Civil War. The Union victory over Confederate forces in northeast Mississippi ensured the safety of Sherman's supply lines during the Atlanta Campaign.

The 1-acre site on Main Street in Tupelo is a grassy park with a flagpole, memorial monument, and two cannons. There are no visitor services; information is provided at the visitor center for the Natchez Trace Parkway six miles north. The monument and site are very similar to that at Brices Cross Roads National Battlefield Site.

Administrative history

The Tupelo National Battlefield was established as "Tupelo Battlefield Site" on February 21, 1929. The site was transferred from the United States War Department to the National Park Service on August 10, 1933, redesignated, and boundary changed on August 10, 1961. In 1936, the Tupelo-Gainesville Tornado destroyed the concrete monument to the battle, ripping it out of the ground and shattering it. The site was listed in the National Register of Historic Places on October 15, 1966.

See also

 Brices Cross Roads National Battlefield
 Natchez Trace Parkway
 National Register of Historic Places listings in Lee County, Mississippi

Notes

References

External links

 Government
 
 General information
 Tupelo National Battlefield at the American Battlefield Protection Program
 Tupelo National Battlefield at the Civil War Trust
 Tupelo National Battlefield at the National Park Foundation

 
1929 establishments in Mississippi
American Civil War on the National Register of Historic Places
Battlefields of the Western Theater of the American Civil War
Conflict sites on the National Register of Historic Places in Mississippi
Natchez Trace
National Battlefields and Military Parks of the United States
National Park Service areas in Mississippi
National Register of Historic Places in Lee County, Mississippi
Parks on the National Register of Historic Places in Mississippi
Protected areas established in 1929
Protected areas of Tupelo, Mississippi